The wrestling tournament at the 1963 Mediterranean Games was held in Naples, Italy.

Medalists

Freestyle
Note 1: Official report mistakenly lists Zardoni (ITA) as winning bronze in Lightweight category, contemporary reports attribute bronze medal to Constantino Kozanidis (GRE).
Note 2: Egypt competed as United Arab Republic (UAR) even though Syria had seceded from the UAR and sent its own team to the 1963 Games. For this reason, UAR results from 1963 are retroactively attributed to Egypt.

Greco-Roman

Medal table

References
1963 Mediterranean Games report at the International Committee of Mediterranean Games (CIJM) website
List of Olympians who won medals at the Mediterranean Games at Olympedia.org

Medi
Wrestling
1963
International wrestling competitions hosted by Italy